|}

The Barry Hills Further Flight Stakes is a Listed flat horse race in Great Britain open to horses aged four years or older.
It is run at Nottingham over a distance of 1 mile and 6 furlongs, and it is scheduled to take place each year in April.

The race was originally named after Michelozzo, the 1989 St Leger winner, who made his debut at Nottingham. It was renamed in 1999 to honour Further Flight, a high-class stayer during the 1990s who won this race twice and was trained by Barry Hills. Since the 2015 running the race has also included Hills' name in its title.

The race was first run in 1993, and has held Listed status since 2003.

Records

Most successful horse (2 wins):
 Further Flight - 1996, 1998
 Alcazar - 2003, 2004

Leading jockey (2 wins):
 Michael Hills - Further Flight (1996, 1998)
 Micky Fenton - Alcazar (2003, 2004)
 Ryan Moore - Frank Sonata (2006), Testosterone (2013)
 Franny Norton -  Elegiac (2019), Sir Ron Priestley (2021) 

Leading trainer (3 wins):
 John Dunlop - Kassab (1994), Khamaseen (1995), Mount Kilimanjaro (2007)
 Mark Johnston -  Winged d'Argent (2005), Elegiac (2019), Sir Ron Priestley (2021)

Winners

See also
Horse racing in Great Britain
List of British flat horse races

References

Racing Post:

Flat races in Great Britain
Nottingham Racecourse
Open long distance horse races
Recurring sporting events established in 1993
1993 establishments in England